Women of the Prehistoric Planet is a 1966 independently made American science fiction/action film directed by Arthur C. Pierce, with Wendell Corey receiving the top billing among the cast.

Plot
A spacefaring crew from an advanced civilization is preparing to return home after an extended voyage. The crew includes "humans" (represented by Caucasian talent) and "Centaurians" (represented by Asian talent).

The Centaurians have been rescued from their home planet after an unspecified catastrophic event has devastated their planet. They are being returned with the spacefaring explorers with an expectation that they will be assimilated into their new parent culture. One of the ships in the fleet is hijacked by a few of its Centaurian passengers and crash-lands on a prehistoric planet in the "Solaris" system. Countermanding orders, the rest of the fleet returns to search for survivors after the crash.

By the time the rescuers (traveling at fast sublight speeds) are able to return to the planet, they encounter the descendants of the original crash survivors - explained in a simplified version of time dilation. Linda, a Centaurian from the rescue ship, falls in love with Tang after he saves her from drowning.

After fighting the planet's indigenous species (including giant iguanas meant to represent dinosaurs), Tang and Linda--revealed to be the Admiral's daughter--are marooned on this savage and primitive planet (which is revealed at the end to be Earth).

Cast
 Wendell Corey as Admiral David King
 Keith Larsen as Commander Scott 
 John Agar as Dr. Farrell
 Paul Gilbert as Lt. Red Bradley
 Merry Anders as Lt. Karen Lamont
 Stuart Margolin as Chief
 Todd Lasswell as Lt. Charles Anderson
 Irene Tsu as Linda
 Robert Ito as Tang Anderson
 Nobuko Miyamoto as Zenda Anderson
 Glenn Langan as Captain Ross
 Sally Frei as Sally
 Suzie Kaye as Ensign Stevens
 Kam Tong as Jung
 Ron Stokes as Sgt. Allen
 Adam Roarke as Harris
 Paul Hampton as Wilson
 Ronald Lyon as Sgt. Nevins
 Hans Wedemeyer as Jang
 Anthony Lee as Navigation Officer
 Joyce Carol as Centaurian Girl on Ship
 Jamie McRae as Sgt. Long

Themes
Race relations are the film's overarching theme, although its approach to the subject has been typically criticized in retrospect.

 "... a blatant social commentary on race relations (from a mid-60s point of view). Even though the screenplay tries to preach fairness, some of the subtle signals send contradictory messages. The crew members of the Cosmos are portrayed as superior. The Centaurians as inferior. The crew are clearly all-white. They dress in tidy white uniforms with snappy cravats. They are in control, follow orders, and are concerned for others. The Centaurians are "rustic," (and all played by asians) Their outfits are sleeveless. Their men are hotheads and trouble makers. (their women are nice, though). Even the "progressive" notion of Tang being the mixed-race son of a "white" and a Centaurian, is undermined by his apparent comfort at being a cave man. Subtle signal: "They" are savages at heart.

 "The real subject matter of the film is race relations, with the "Centaurians" all being played by Asian actors and the "Humans" all played by whites and the message is that different races can and should get along. This is a noble sentiment of course, but the movie around it is both incredibly clunky, unintentionally condescending and has an incredibly lazy twist at the end."

Reviews
Leonard Maltin gave the film one and a half stars. Writing for AllMovie, critic Bruce Eder described the film as a "camp classic" that features "laughable special effects", "obviously rushed performances", and an "awkward interjection of some lunkhead humor". The film has an 18% approval rating at the review aggregator website Rotten Tomatoes. Other reviewers have assessed the film as a "bomb" and described it as "Typical bad sci-fi ... with horrid special effects".

Home media
Englewood Entertainment first released the original film on VHS videotape, and later on DVD. The film's MST3K version was broadcast as episode #104 and was released by Rhino Home Video as part of their DVD "Collection, Volume 9" box set; it was accompanied by a short introduction by actress Irene Tsu (Linda).

Poster
Women of the Prehistoric Planet's provocative film poster features the tagline "It's a battle of the sexes as savage planet women attack female space invaders" and depicts a blonde and a brunette in a catfight. However, there are no "planet women" in the film, as the only female Centurian (Irene Tsu) does not originate from the prehistoric planet. Nor does the film contain any scenes of women fighting each other.

See also
List of American films of 1966

References

External links
 
 
 Satellite News: MST3K Season 1 Episode Guide
 Episode guide: 104- Women of the Prehistoric Planet
 

1966 films
1960s science fiction action films
American adventure films
American science fiction action films
1960s English-language films
American independent films
Films about extraterrestrial life
Films about dinosaurs
1960s American films
1966 independent films